The Centre for Cultural Resources and Training (CCRT) is autonomous organisation                                          under Ministry of Culture of Government of India. Established in May 1979, to support cultural education, with its inception it took over the Scheme-Propagation of Culture among College and School students, which was being implemented by Delhi University since 1970, where a Research and Production Cell was functioning for this purpose.

Overview 

The CCRT also
 organises activities such as school tours to museums, monuments and craft centres
 collects teaching resources including photographs, audio recordings, films and software
 publishes materials to promote understanding of Indian art and culture
 has a "Cultural Talent Search Scholarship Scheme" for children aged 10–14, to help them develop their abilities in cultural fields especially rarer forms of art
 presents annual "CCRT Teachers' Awards"

References

External links 
 http://ccrtindia.gov.in/publication.php

1979 establishments in India
Cultural organisations based in India
Colleges of education in India
Educational organisations based in India
Organizations established in 1979
Organisations based in Delhi
Ministry of Culture (India)
Training organisations in India